A regulatory agency (regulatory body, regulator) or independent agency (independent regulatory agency) is a government authority that is responsible for exercising autonomous dominion over some area of human activity in a licensing and regulating capacity.

These are customarily set up to strengthen safety and standards, and/or to protect consumers in markets where there is a lack of effective competition. Examples of regulatory agencies that enforce standards include the Food and Drug Administration in the United States and the Medicines and Healthcare products Regulatory Agency in the United Kingdom; and, in the case of economic regulation, the Office of Gas and Electricity Markets and the Telecom Regulatory Authority in India.

Legislative basis 
Regulatory agencies are generally a part of the executive branch of the government and have statutory authority to perform their functions with oversight from the legislative branch. Their actions are often open to legal review.

Regulatory agencies deal in the areas of administrative law, regulatory law, secondary legislation, and rulemaking (codifying and enforcing rules and regulations, and imposing supervision or oversight for the benefit of the public at large). The existence of independent regulatory agencies is justified by the complexity of certain regulatory and directorial tasks, and the drawbacks of political interference. Some independent regulatory agencies perform investigations or audits, and other may fine the relevant parties and order certain measures. In a number of cases, in order for a company or organization to enter an industry, it must obtain a license to operate from the sector regulator. This license will set out the conditions by which the companies or organizations operating within the industry must abide.

Functioning 
Regulatory regimes vary by country and industry. In the most light-touch forms of regulation, regulatory agencies are typically charged with overseeing an industry, intervening only when there is a reasonable suspicion that a regulated company may not be complying with its obligations. Under such a regime, regulatory agencies typically have powers to:
 oblige individuals or firms entering the industry to obtain a license;
 require transparency of information and decision-making on part of the regulated company; and
 monitor the performance and investigate the compliance of the regulated company, with the regulator publishing the findings of its investigations.
In the event that the regulated company is not in compliance with its license obligations or the law, the regulatory agency may be empowered to:
 require that administrators of the regulated company explain their actions;
 undertake enforcement action, such as directing the regulated company to comply through orders, imposing financial penalties and/or revoking its license to operate; or
 refer the regulated company to a competition authority, in instances where it may have breached competition law, or prosecute the company (via civil courts).

In some instances, it is deemed in the public interest (by the legislative branch of government) for regulatory agencies to be given powers in addition to the above. This more interventionist form of regulation is common in the provision of public utilities, which are subject to economic regulation. In this case, regulatory agencies have powers to:
 require the provision of particular outputs and/or service levels; and
 set price controls or a rate-of-return for the regulated company.

The functions of regulatory agencies in prolong "collaborative governance" provide for generally non-adversarial regulation. Ex post actions taken by regulatory agencies can be more adversarial and involve sanctions, influencing rulemaking, and creating quasi-common law. However, the roles of regulatory agencies as "regulatory monitors" provide a vital function in administering law and ensuring compliance.

Areas

Advertising regulation
Alcoholic beverages
Bank regulation
Consumer protection
Cyber-security regulation
Economic regulation
Environmental regulation
Financial regulation
Food safety and food security
Noise regulation
Nuclear safety
Minerals
Occupational safety and health
Public health
Regulation and monitoring of pollution
Regulation of acupuncture
Regulation of nanotechnology
Regulation of sport
Regulation of therapeutic goods
Regulation through litigation
Vehicle regulation
Regulation of ship pollution in the United States
Regulation and prevalence of homeopathy
Regulation of science
Wage regulation

By country or international organization
Agencies of the European Union
Independent agencies of the United States government
Independent regulatory agencies in Turkey
List of regulators in the United Kingdom
List of regulators in India

See also

Civil service commission
Code of Federal Regulations
Constitutional economics
Constitutional institution
Deregulation
Election management body
International regulation
Impersonating a public servant
Journal of Regulatory Economics
Law enforcement agency
Liberalization
Public administration
Public utilities commission
Quango
Quasi-judicial body
Regulation school
Regulatory capture
Regulatory compliance
Regulatory economics

References

Notes 

 
 
 

•
.
 
Government agencies by type
Government institutions